Crawford Market Fountain or Lockwood Kipling Fountain is a listed heritage structure in Crawford Market, Mumbai that was erected in 1874, and was designed by William Emerson, the British architect who also designed the market. The style is a mix of Greek Revival and Neo-Gothic, and the four carvings depicting the Indian river goddesses and native birds were done by John Lockwood Kipling (father of novelist Rudyard Kipling), who was the principal at Sir Jamsetjee Jeejebhoy School of Art. 

Originally, it was located in a garden courtyard setting and was meant to serve as a social space for merchants. The uncontrolled proliferation of shops around it led to a drastic change in setting, and today 
vegetable and fruit sellers often set up their stalls around it or use the structure to temporarily store their wares. 

In 1985, the crown of the fountain was damaged when a canopy was being raised over it. The Kipling river goddesses frieze was also painted over by someone with the intention to restore their "modesty", as claimed in a note left by the conscientious painter on the fountain. In 2016-17, as part of a larger project, restoration work was carried out on the fountain by a team led by conservation architect Abha Narain Lambah, but thereafter the structure continued to be used as a mini warehouse or a dumping site for plastic bags, water bottles or garbage.

References

Fountains in Mumbai
1874 sculptures
Buildings and structures completed in 1874
Stone sculptures
Drinking fountains
Outdoor sculptures in India